Alexander Quaderer (born 13 February 1971) is a retired Liechtenstein football midfielder.

References

1971 births
Living people
Liechtenstein footballers
FC Vaduz players
FC Schaan players
Association football midfielders
Liechtenstein international footballers